Green Hill is a mountain or fell in north west England. It is located above Cowan Bridge, Lancashire, near Kirkby Lonsdale, Cumbria, and Ingleton, North Yorkshire. Its summit is about 4 kilometres (2½ miles) almost due west of the summit of Whernside. It forms the watershed between the River Dee and the Leck Beck: both are tributaries of the River Lune.

Geography
The highest point of the traditional county of Lancashire is Coniston Old Man, which, together with the rest of Furness became part of Cumbria in 1974.

Another county top close to Green Hill is Whernside, the highest point in North Yorkshire.

The summit of Green Hill, although relatively dull in itself, provides many excellent views in all directions ranging from the Howgill Fells and Lakeland fells to the north, the Pennines in the east, and a majority of North Yorkshire to the south.

County Stone

Near to the summit of Green Hill, lies the County Stone, a large glacial erratic boulder which marks the triple point where the traditional counties of Westmorland, Yorkshire and Lancashire borders converged.

References

Mountains and hills of Lancashire
Geography of the City of Lancaster
Mountains and hills of Cumbria
Dent, Cumbria